The Karadzhalovo Solar Park is a 60.4 megawatt (MW) solar farm, the largest in Bulgaria. It has 214,000 photovoltaic panels, and cost 350 million Bulgarian lev (approximatively $248 million).
It has been completed in March 2012 after 4 month of construction.

Financing 
The total project cost amounting to 181.4 million in Euro was financed by:
 a loan of EUR 155 million from a group of investors led by IFC with 
 IFC (International Financial Corporation) providing EUR 46.1 million
 UniCredit Group - EUR 41.1 million
 OPIC (Overseas Private Investment Corporation) - EUR 50 million
 UniCredit Bulbank Bulgaria completed the investment with a separate EUR 30 million loan

Three month after completion, it was resold to the Malta-based ACF Renewable Energy, which is reported to be owned by investors from the US, Sri Lanka, India and Pakistan. The selling price has been reported to be equal to the construction price of BGN 350 million.

See also 

Photovoltaic power station
List of largest power stations
List of photovoltaic power stations

References 

Photovoltaic power stations in Bulgaria
Buildings and structures in Plovdiv Province